Chirakkal may refer to:

Families
 Chirakkal Royal Family, title of the most senior king of the Chirakkal branch of the Palli division of the Kolathiri dynasty of the erstwhile feudal state of Kolathunadu
 Chirakkal Kovilakam, one of two branches of the Kodungallur Royal Family of Kerala

Places
 Chirakkal, Kannur, a census town in Kannur District, Kerala, India
 Chirakkal railway station, in Kannur District, Kerala
 Chirakkal, Thrissur, a village in Thrissur District, Kerala, India

Other uses
 Chirakkal Kelu Nayanar, a character in the 2011 Indian film Urumi